"Free" is the second single from British singer-songwriter Estelle's debut album, The 18th Day (2004). The song features a rap from So Solid Crew's Megaman. It preceded the album's release by two weeks. In "Free", Estelle raps and sings about living life in a positive way, spreading love, being oneself, and working hard to achieve the most one can in life.

Released on 4 October 2004, "Free" peaked at number 15 on the UK Singles Chart and was Estelle's second consecutive solo top-20 hit, peaking only one place lower than her previous single "1980". In Australia, it was released as the final single from the album on 29 November 2004 and reached number 49 on the ARIA Singles Chart. In Ireland, the song peaked at number 50.

Music video
The music video for "Free" was directed by Andy Hylton. As well as featuring an appearance from guest rapper Megaman, the video features cameos from fellow British singers Beverley Knight, Natasha Bedingfield, Terri Walker, Kelli Young of Liberty X, Jamie Scott, Indo-Canadian singer Raghav and US singer John Legend.

The video leads into B-side "Freedom", which features John Legend on piano.

Track listings

UK CD1
 "Free" (featuring Megaman) – 3:22
 "Freedom" (featuring John Legend) – 5:06

UK CD2
 "Free" (featuring Megaman) – 3:22
 "Freedom" (featuring John Legend) – 5:06
 "Change Is Coming" – 4:01

Australian CD single
 "Free" (featuring Megaman)
 "Freedom" (featuring John Legend)
 "Change Is Coming"
 "Free" (Girls remix)

Personnel
Personnel are lifted from the UK CD1 liner notes.
 Estelle Swaray – writing, vocals, backing vocals
 Jimmy Hogarth – writing, production, guitar
 Megaman – writing, vocals
 E-Boogie – co-arrangement
 Jason Joyce – photography

Charts

Release history

References

2004 singles
2004 songs
Estelle (musician) songs
Festival Records singles
Songs written by Estelle (musician)
Songs written by Jimmy Hogarth
UK Independent Singles Chart number-one singles
V2 Records singles